Alcester Town Football Club is a football club based in Alcester, Warwickshire, England.

History
The club was established after World War I under the name Alcester Old Boys, as a team for former pupils of Alcester Grammar School. In 1927 they joined Division One of the Stratford League and were renamed Alcester Juniors. In the 1950s the club adopted their current name. They joined the Eastern Division of the Warwickshire Combination in 1962, where they played for three seasons before transferring to Division Two of the Worcestershire Combination in 1965. The league renamed the Midland Combination three years later. In 1971–72 the club were Division Two runners-up, but were not promoted to Division One. Division Two was renamed Division One in 1983.

Alcester were relegated to Division Two at the end of the 1988–89 season. They were promoted back to Division One after finishing as runners-up in Division Two the following season, and went on to win the Division One title in 1990–91, earning promotion to the Premier Division. However, after finishing bottom of the Premier Division in 1992–93, the club folded as they were unable to bring their ground up to the requirements of the league.

The club was re-established in 2007, joining the Stratford Alliance. They were Division Three champions in 2008–09 and were promoted to the Premier Division by 2011. After winning the Premier Division title in 2011–12, the club rejoined the Midland Combination, entering Division Two. When the league merged with the Midland Alliance to form the Midland League in 2014, they were placed in Division Three. The club were Division Three champions in 2018–19, earning promotion to Division Two.

Ground
The club originally played on a pitch next to Spittle Brook, before moving to one on Bleachfield Street in an area that was known as the 'Soccer Beds'. By the 1950s they had relocated to Stratford Road.

Honours
Midland League
Division Three champions 2018–19
Midland Combination
Division One champions 1990–91
Stratford Alliance
Premier Division champions 2011–12
Division Three champions 2008–09
Stratford League
Division One champions 1927–28

Records
Best FA Vase performance: First round, 1975–76

See also
Alcester Town F.C. players

References

External links

Football clubs in England
Football clubs in Warwickshire
Midland Football Combination
Midland Football League
Alcester